Tan Sri Mohtar bin Abdullah was a Malaysian lawyer. He was the Attorney General of Malaysia from 1994 to 2000 and also served as a judge in the High Court and Federal Court.

Biography
Mohtar studied at the University of Singapore. He entered the judicial and legal service in 1971. He served as a judge on the High Court from 1990 to 1994 before being appointed Attorney General. After his tenure as Attorney General, he was appointed to the Federal Court in January 2002.

Less than three months into his term, he suffered a stroke. After surgery to remove a blood clot in his brain, Mohtar fell into coma for a nearly year. He died on July 7, 2003, in Kuala Lumpur Hospital aged 59.

Honours

Honours of Malaysia
  : 
 Officer of the Order of the Defender of the Realm (KMN) (1983)
 Commander of the Order of Loyalty to the Crown of Malaysia (PSM) - Tan Sri (1996)
 Commander of the Order of the Defender of the Realm (PMN) - Tan Sri (1999)
 :
 Knight Grand Commander of the Order of the Life of the Crown of Kelantan (SJMK) - Dato’ (1998)
 :
 Grand Commander of the Exalted Order of Malacca (DGSM) - Datuk Seri (1998)

References

Attorneys General of Malaysia
Malaysian people of Malay descent
2003 deaths
Malaysian Muslims
20th-century Malaysian lawyers
University of Singapore alumni
Year of birth missing
Officers of the Order of the Defender of the Realm
Commanders of the Order of Loyalty to the Crown of Malaysia
Commanders of the Order of the Defender of the Realm
21st-century Malaysian lawyers